"I'll Never Fall in Love Again" is a 1968 Burt Bacharach song.

I'll Never Fall in Love Again may also refer to:
 "I'll Never Fall in Love Again" (Lonnie Donegan song) (1962), popularized by Tom Jones
 "I'll Never Fall in Love Again", a song from 1950s, written and performed by Johnnie Ray
 I'll Never Fall in Love Again, a 1970 album by Bobbie Gentry
 I'll Never Fall in Love Again, a 1970 album by Dionne Warwick